The Volvo F88/F89 was a series of heavy-duty trucks produced by Swedish automaker Volvo between 1965 and 1977.

Volvo presented the forward control F88 in 1965. The truck was the first part of the company's export-oriented "System 8", which served as basis for the truck giant Volvo is today. The F88 sold well internationally and began a reputation for durable cab-over trucks.

Volvo F88
The F88 cab had already been introduced on the predecessor Titan Tiptop in 1964, but the rest of the truck was redesigned. This included a new engine, a new eight-speed gear box and stronger chassis and suspension.

A derivative was the G88 introduced in 1970, which was basically the same vehicle but with the front axle fitted  further forward to allow greater axle spread.

Volvo F89 
In 1971 the larger 'F89' was introduced, with the new twelve litre engine, which development started in 1969. The truck and the engine were designed to meet a West German regulation that put a lower limit for the number of horsepower per GCWR. In order to continue selling trucks in the heaviest class, Volvo developed a new, more powerful engine and the F89 was the first Volvo truck to be sold with turbo engines only. The TD120 engine was so tall that it must be mounted inclined in the frame to fit under the cab. This made it impossible to convert the truck for right-hand drive.

Engines

Gallery

References

External links 

 Volvo Trucks Global - history
 Swedish brass cars - picture gallery

F88
Vehicles introduced in 1965